Sofía Esmeralda Mercedes Heredia born May 25, 1976 in Santo Domingo, is a volleyball player from the Dominican Republic. Sofia Esmeralda won the gold medal with the women's national team at the 2003 Pan American Games in her home town Santo Domingo, Dominican Republic. Playing as a wing-spiker she also competed at the 2004 Summer Olympics for her native country.

She played for the 2003/2004 season with the Italian team Siram Roma. Later that year, she helped the Dominican professional team Los Cachorros to finish in second place for the Dominican Republic 2004 season.

Clubs
  Olimpia Teodora Ravenna (1999–2000)
  San Cristóbal (2000–2002)
  Siram Roma (2003–2004)
  Los Cachorros (2004)
  Ribeira Sacra (2006–2007)
  University of Trinidad and Tobago (2008)

Awards

Clubs
 2004 Dominican Republic Distrito Nacional Superior Tournament –  Runner-Up, with Los Cachorros

References

External links
 FIVB profile

1976 births
Living people
Dominican Republic women's volleyball players
Volleyball players at the 2004 Summer Olympics
Olympic volleyball players of the Dominican Republic
Volleyball players at the 2003 Pan American Games
Volleyball players at the 2007 Pan American Games
Pan American Games gold medalists for the Dominican Republic
Pan American Games medalists in volleyball
Wing spikers
Expatriate volleyball players in Italy
Expatriate volleyball players in Spain
Dominican Republic expatriate sportspeople in Trinidad and Tobago
Dominican Republic expatriate sportspeople in Italy
Dominican Republic expatriate sportspeople in Spain
Medalists at the 2003 Pan American Games